The 1991 Washington Huskies football team represented the University of Washington in the 1991 NCAA Division I-A football season. Head coach Don James, in his 17th season at Washington, was assisted by coordinators Keith Gilbertson (offense) and Jim Lambright (defense), both head coaches themselves within two years.

The 1991 team was arguably the finest team in school history and split the national championship with the Miami Hurricanes, who were also 12–0, and won the AP Poll by four votes, while Washington took the coaches' poll by nine. Washington could not have played Miami in a bowl game because the Pac-10 champion was bound by contract to play in the Rose Bowl against the Big Ten champion. The Huskies soundly defeated fourth-ranked Michigan 34–14 in the Rose Bowl; the final score differential was narrowed by a late touchdown by Tyrone Wheatley of Michigan. With a minute remaining in the game, Washington was on the Michigan five-yard line, but opted to stay on the ground and run out the clock with third-string quarterback Damon Huard leading the offense.

Eleven Huskies were selected in the 1992 NFL Draft, led by Steve Emtman, a dominating yet under-recruited defensive tackle from Cheney.  Emtman won both the Lombardi Award and the Outland Trophy, and finished fourth in the Heisman Trophy balloting, won by Desmond Howard of Michigan. Defensive back Dana Hall was also selected in the first round.

A fantasy article in Sports Illustrated titled "The Dream Game" had the Huskies narrowly defeat Miami in a playoff.

Overview
The Huskies were ranked fourth in the 1991 pre-season. They dominated their six home games within the friendly raucous confines of Husky Stadium, which included two lopsided shutouts.  The Dawgs' three closest games in 1991 were on the road: against Nebraska, California, and USC.

Behind 14–6 at halftime in Lincoln on ABC to no. 9 Nebraska in the second game of the season, UW rallied to outscore NU in Lincoln 30–7 in the second half to win by 15, and were graciously applauded at game-end by the Cornhusker fans. In mid-October, the no. 7 Cal Bears were the next-best team in the Pac-10 in 1991; the Huskies won by a touchdown in Berkeley to go to 6–0.  In November in Los Angeles, the Huskies entered the game against USC undefeated at 8–0 and won a 14–3 defensive struggle, a second-straight victory over the previously-dominant Trojans.

Like the rest of the Pac-10 in 1991, the Huskies played just eight Pac-10 conference games, missing one opponent; they did not play UCLA in 1991 or 1992. The 1991 Bruins finished at 9–3 (6–2 in conference), in the top twenty in both polls (no. 18 and no. 19). UCLA lost to Tennessee of the SEC and both Bay Area teams, Cal and Stanford, but won their bowl game.

Schedule

Source:

Roster

Rankings

Game summaries

at Stanford

    
    
    
    
    
    
    

Washington's forced five turnovers and scored four touchdowns on the ground in a 42-7 season opening victory at Stanford.  Cornerback Walter Bailey had an interception and a fumble recovery, while running back Jay Barry ran for two scores.  Billy Joe Hobert, making his first career start, completed 21 of 31 passes for 244 yards and two touchdowns.

Source:

at Nebraska

    
    
    
    
    
    
    
    
    

Source:

Kansas State

Arizona

Toledo

at California

Oregon

Arizona State

at USC

at Oregon State

Washington State

vs. Michigan (Rose Bowl)

Awards and honors

National
 All-Americans: Mario Bailey, Steve Emtman, Dave Hoffmann, Lincoln Kennedy (Consensus in Bold)
Steve Emtman: Lombardi Award
Steve Emtman: Outland Trophy
Don James: FWAA Coach of the Year

Conference
 All-Pacific-10: Mario Bailey, Lincoln Kennedy, Ed Cunningham, Steve Emtman, Dave Hoffmann, Chico Fraley, Donald Jones, Dana Hall
 Pacific-10 Offensive Player of the Year: Mario Bailey
 Pacific-10 Defensive Player of the Year: Steve Emtman
 Pacific-10 Coach of the Year: Don James

NFL Draft selections
Eleven University of Washington Huskies were selected in the 1992 NFL Draft, which lasted twelve rounds with 336 selections.

Both 1991 UW quarterbacks were selected in the following year's 1993 NFL Draft: '91 soph. starter Billy Joe Hobert by the Los Angeles Raiders (3rd rd., 58th) and junior Mark Brunell ('90 soph. starter, injured in spring '91 practice, '92 senior starter) by the Green Bay Packers (5th rd., 118th); where he was a reserve for two seasons behind Brett Favre, then led the expansion Jacksonville Jaguars in 1995.

References

Washington
Washington Huskies football seasons
College football national champions
Pac-12 Conference football champion seasons
Rose Bowl champion seasons
College football undefeated seasons
Washington Huskies football